Hollinwood may refer to two places in England:

Hollinwood, Greater Manchester, an area of Oldham.
Hollinwood, Shropshire, a village near Wales.